The 2010 FIM Individual Ice Racing World Championship was the 2010 version of FIM Individual Ice Racing World Championship season. The world champion was determined in nine finals in five cities between 6 February and 21 March 2010. The championship title was won by the defending champion Nikolay Krasnikov, who won seven of nine events. It was his sixth world champion title. The silver medal was won by Daniil Ivanov, who won the other two events. Dmitry Khomitsevich was third. The top five placing riders were from Russia. The first not-Russian rider was Franz Zorn from Austria.

Qualifications

Riders 

After each Final, the two reserve riders become scheduled riders in the next Final, even if they have taken part in the Final where they are reserve riders. Therefore, the two lowest point scoring riders (not being the two reserve riders from that Final) on the Intermediate FIM Ice Racing World Championship Classification will become reserve riders in the next Final. The best placed rider will be the first reserve rider with draw number seventeen, and the second rider will be the second reserve with draw number eighteen.

Grand Prix

Final One 
 February 6–7, 2010
  Tolyatti, Samara Oblast
”STROITEL” Stadium (Length: 260 m)
Referee:  Wojciech Grodzki
Jury President:  C. Bergstrøm
References

Final Two 
February 13–14, 2010
  Saransk, Republic of Mordovia
”Svetotechnika” Stadium (Length: 360 m)
Referee:  Anthony Steele
Jury President:  Andrzej Grodzki
References

Final Three (only one event) 
February 21, 2010
  Innsbruck, Tyrol
Olympiaworld (Length: 400 m)
Referee:  Krister Gardell
Jury President:  Janos Nadasi
References      

This meeting was scheduled to take place on February 20 and 21. However, the meeting was delayed because of poor track conditions. The first day's program (heat 1 to 20 and four final heats) was held on Sunday.

Rider #17 – in heats 5 and 13
Rider #18 – in heats 9 and 17

Final Four 
March 13–14, 2010
  Assen, Drenthe
De Bonte Wever (Length: 370 m)
Referee:  Wojciech Grodzki
Jury President:  Christer Bergström
References

Final Five 
March 20–21, 2010
  Wilmersdorf, Berlin
Horst-Dohm-Eisstadion (Length: 386m)
Referee:  Istvan Darago
Jury President:  Jörgen Jensen
References     
Changes:
 Sven Holstein →  René Stellingwerf

Classification 

In case of one or more ties on the Intermediate Classification of the Championship, the following will apply:
 Best place in the last Final run.
In case of riders involved in a tie on the Final Overall Classification at the end of the Championship, the following will apply:
 Run-off for 1st, 2nd and 3rd place.
 Best place in the last Final meeting.

See also 
 2010 Team Ice Racing World Championship
 2010 Speedway Grand Prix in classic speedway

References 

Ice speedway competitions
World Individual